A by-election was held for the New South Wales Legislative Assembly electorate of Central Cumberland on 24 December 1887 because of the resignation of Andrew McCulloch due to insolvency, having assigned his estate for the benefit of his creditors.

Dates

Candidates
 Nathaniel Bull  was a former member for Central Cumberland who had been defeated at the election in February 1887.

 Andrew McCulloch was the sitting member.

Result

				

Andrew McCulloch resigned due to insolvency.

See also
Electoral results for the district of Central Cumberland
List of New South Wales state by-elections

References

Central Cumberland
New South Wales state by-elections
1880s in New South Wales